Colin Tilney (born 31 October 1933) is a harpsichordist, fortepianist and teacher.

Education and professional life
Born in London, Tilney studied music and modern languages at Cambridge University, studied harpsichord with Mary Potts at King's College, Cambridge, and became a student of Gustav Leonhardt. After graduation at Cambridge he spent several years as an opera coach and piano accompanist at Sadler's Wells Theatre and the New Opera Company, following which he focused his energies on teaching and performing on early keyboard instruments. In 1964 he was the harpsichordist under the direction of Igor Stravinsky for the second Columbia recording of The Rake's Progress.

Life and work in Canada
In 1979 Tilney moved to Canada and settled in Toronto, where he continued to teach privately and at the Royal Conservatory of Music. He performed with Tafelmusik Baroque Orchestra and the Toronto Consort, as well as touring to Asia, Australia, Europe and Great Britain. In 1985 he formed the chamber ensemble Les Coucous Bénévoles, which regularly commissions new music by Canadian composers. He taught for several seasons at the Dartington Summer Festival in Totnes, England. He has been recorded for radio broadcast by the BBC and CBC, which has issued CDs of his performances. In 2002 Tilney moved to Victoria, British Columbia, where he continues to teach and perform.

Performance philosophy
Tilney is well known for his historically informed approach to performance practice, performing on original instruments or copies thereof, largely using contemporary scores.

Works
Tilney's contributions to literature include The Art of the Unmeasured Prelude: France 1660 to 1720 (Schott's, London, 1991), and previously unpublished harpsichord music by Antoine Forqueray (Heugel, 1970).

Tilney has a long discography of harpsichord and fortepiano performances from labels including Dorian, Deutsche Harmonia Mundi, L'Oiseau-Lyre, EMI Reflexe, Nonesuch, Vangard, DoReMi and several others.

Sources
Bach Cantatas

1933 births
Living people
British harpsichordists
Musicians from London
Academic staff of The Royal Conservatory of Music
Alumni of King's College, Cambridge
British performers of early music